The 1994 Stanford Cardinal football team represented Stanford University in the 1994 NCAA Division I-A football season. The Cardinal played in the Pacific-10 Conference. After back-to-back disappointing seasons, this was Bill Walsh's last season as Stanford's head coach.

Schedule

Game summaries

at Northwestern

San Jose State

Arizona

at Notre Dame

at Arizona State

Southern California

Oregon State

at UCLA

at Washington

Oregon

at California

Roster

References

Stanford
Stanford Cardinal football seasons
Stanford Cardinal football